Edgar A. Sherman (July 13, 1912 – September 29, 2009) was an American football player and coach.  He served as the head football coach at Muskingum College from 1945 to 1966, compiling a record of 141–43–7, a winning percentage of .757. He also served as Muskingum director of athletics, and he worked as a basketball referee. His Muskingum coaching career ended after the 1966 season but he remained on the faculty through 1980. He also coached the Muskingum track team and had a record of 111–21 in dual meets. Sherman was known for his service to the National Collegiate Athletic Association (NCAA_. He was the NCAA secretary-treasurer for a two-year term and chairman of a committee which established the I-A, I-AA, II, III divisions, he was on the NCAA television committee and the NCAA-NAIA joint committee. He served 22 NCAA committees. Sherman received a White House citation for contribution in athletics. In 1982, he received the Corbett Award honoring his work as a college director of athletics. In 1986 Muskingum named its football field for him.  Sherman was inducted into the College Football Hall of Fame as a coach in 1996.  He died on September 29, 2009.

Head coaching record

References

External links
 
 

1912 births
2009 deaths
American football quarterbacks
Miami RedHawks football coaches
Muskingum Fighting Muskies football coaches
Muskingum Fighting Muskies football players
High school football coaches in Ohio
College Football Hall of Fame inductees
People from Licking County, Ohio
Coaches of American football from Ohio
Players of American football from Ohio